The 1950 Wake Forest Demon Deacons football team was an American football team that represented Wake Forest University during the 1950 college football season. In its 14th and final season under head coach Peahead Walker, the team compiled a 6–1–2 record and finished in fourth place in the Southern Conference.

Schedule

Team leaders

References

Wake Forest
Wake Forest Demon Deacons football seasons
Wake Forest Demon Deacons football